Vedic Sanskrit was an ancient language of the Indo-Aryan subgroup of the Indo-European language family. It is attested in the Vedas and related literature compiled over the period of the mid-2nd to mid-1st millennium BCE. It was orally preserved, predating the advent of writing by several centuries.

Extensive ancient literature in the Vedic Sanskrit language has survived into the modern era, and this has been a major source of information for reconstructing Proto-Indo-European and Proto-Indo-Iranian history.

In the pre-historic era, Proto-Indo-Iranian split into Proto-Iranian and Proto-Indo-Aryan and the two languages evolved independently of each other.

History

Prehistoric derivation

The separation of Proto-Indo-Iranian language into Proto-Iranian and Proto-Indo-Aryan is estimated, on linguistic grounds, to have occurred around or before 1800 BCE. 
The date of composition of the oldest hymns of the Rigveda is vague at best, generally estimated to roughly 1500 BCE. Both Asko Parpola (1988) and J. P. Mallory (1998) place the locus of the division of Indo-Aryan from Iranian in the Bronze Age culture of the Bactria–Margiana Archaeological Complex (BMAC). Parpola (1999) elaborates the model and has "Proto-Rigvedic" Indo-Aryans intrude the BMAC around 1700 BCE. He assumes early Indo-Aryan presence in the Late Harappan horizon from about 1900 BCE, and "Proto-Rigvedic" (Proto-Dardic) intrusion to Punjab as corresponding to the Gandhara grave culture from about 1700 BCE. According to this model, Rigvedic within the larger Indo-Aryan group is the direct ancestor of the Dardic languages.

The early Vedic Sanskrit language was far less homogeneous compared to the language defined by Pāṇini, i.e., Classic Sanskrit. The language in the early Upanishads of Hinduism and the late Vedic literature approaches Classical Sanskrit. The formalization of the late form of Vedic Sanskrit language into the Classical Sanskrit form is credited to Pāṇini's Aṣṭādhyāyī, along with Patanjali's Mahabhasya and Katyayana's commentary that preceded Patanjali's work.

Chronology
Five chronologically distinct strata can be identified within the Vedic language:

 Ṛg-vedic
 Mantra
 Saṃhitā prose
 Brāhmaṇa prose
 Sūtras

The first three are commonly grouped together, as the Saṃhitās comprising the four Vedas: ṛk, atharvan, yajus, sāman, which together constitute the oldest texts in Sanskrit and the canonical foundation both of the Vedic religion, and the later religion known as Hinduism.

Ṛg-vedic 
Many words in the Vedic Sanskrit of the Ṛg·veda have cognates or direct correspondences with the ancient Avestan language, but these do not appear in post-Rigvedic Indian texts. The text of the  Ṛg·veda must have been essentially complete by around the 12th century BCE. The pre-1200 BCE layers mark a gradual change in Vedic Sanskrit, but there is disappearance of these archaic correspondences and linguistics in the post-Rigvedic period.

Mantra language 
This period includes both the mantra and prose language of the Atharvaveda (Paippalada and Shaunakiya), the Ṛg·veda Khilani, the Samaveda Saṃhitā, and the mantras of the Yajurveda. These texts are largely derived from the Ṛg·veda, but have undergone certain changes, both by linguistic change and by reinterpretation. For example, the more ancient injunctive verb system is no longer in use.

Saṃhitā 
An important linguistic change is the disappearance of the injunctive, subjunctive, optative, imperative (the aorist). New innovations in Vedic Sanskrit appear such as the development of periphrastic aorist forms. This must have occurred before the time of Pāṇini because Panini makes a list of those from the northwestern region of India who knew these older rules of Vedic Sanskrit.

Brāhmaṇa prose 
In this layer of Vedic literature, the archaic Vedic Sanskrit verb system has been abandoned, and a prototype of pre-Panini Vedic Sanskrit structure emerges. The Yajñagāthās texts provide a probable link between Vedic Sanskrit, Classical Sanskrit and languages of the Epics. Complex meters such as Anuṣṭubh and rules of Sanskrit prosody had been or were being innovated by this time, but parts of the Brāhmaṇa layers show the language is still close to Vedic Sanskrit.

Sūtra language 
This is the last stratum of Vedic literature, comprising the bulk of the Śrautasūtras and Gṛhyasūtras and some Upaniṣads such as the Kaṭha Upaniṣad and Maitrāyaṇiya Upaniṣad. These texts elucidate the state of the language which formed the basis of Pāṇini's codification into Classical Sanskrit.

Phonology
Vedic differs from Classical Sanskrit to an extent comparable to the difference between Homeric Greek and Classical Greek.

The following differences may be observed in the phonology:

 Vedic had a voiceless bilabial fricative (called upadhmānīya) and a voiceless velar fricative (called jihvāmūlīya)—which used to occur as allophones of visarga ḥ appeared before voiceless labial and velar consonants respectively. Both of them were lost in Classical Sanskrit to give way to the simple visarga.

 The vowels e and o were actually realized in Vedic as diphthongs ai and au, but they became pure monophthongs in later Sanskrit, such as  > and >. However, the diphthongal behaviour still resurfaces in sandhi.
 The vowels ai  and au were correspondingly realized in Vedic as long diphthongs āi and āu, but they became correspondingly short in Classical Sanskrit:  > .
 The Prātiśākhyas claim that the "dental" consonants were articulated from the root of the teeth (dantamūlīya, alveolar), but they became pure dentals later, whereas most other systems including Pāṇini designate them as dentals. 
 The Prātiśākhyas are inconsistent about  but generally claim that it was also a dantamūlīya. According to Pāṇini it is a retroflex consonant.
 The pluti (trimoraic) vowels were on the verge of becoming phonemicized during middle Vedic, but disappeared again.
 Vedic often allowed two like vowels in certain cases to come together in hiatus without merger during sandhi, which has been reconstructed as the influence of an old laryngeal still present in the Proto-Indo-Iranian stage of the language: PIE  → va·ata-.

Accent

Vedic had a pitch accent which could even change the meaning of the words, and was still in use in Pāṇini's time, as we can infer by his use of devices to indicate its position. At some latter time, this was replaced by a stress accent limited to the second to fourth syllables from the end.

Since a small number of words in the late pronunciation of Vedic carry the so-called "independent svarita" on a short vowel, one can argue that late Vedic was marginally a tonal language. Note however that in the metrically-restored versions of the Rig Veda almost all of the syllables carrying an independent svarita must revert to a sequence of two syllables, the first of which carries an udātta and the second a so-called dependent svarita. Early Vedic was thus definitely not a tonal language like Chinese but a pitch accent language like Japanese, which was inherited from the Proto-Indo-European accent.

Pitch accent was not restricted to Vedic: early Sanskrit grammarian Pāṇini gives both accent rules for the spoken language of his (post-Vedic) time as well as the differences of Vedic accent. We have, however, no extant post-Vedic text with accents.

Pluti 

Pluti, or prolation, is the term for the phenomenon of protracted or overlong vowels in Sanskrit; the overlong or prolated vowels are themselves called pluta. Pluta vowels are usually noted with a numeral "3" indicating a length of three morae.

A diphthong is prolated by prolongation of its first vowel.

Pluta vowels are recorded a total of 3 times in the Rigveda and 15 times in the Atharvaveda, typically in cases of questioning and particularly where two options are being compared. For example:
 
 "Was it above? Was it below?"
 Rigveda 10.129.5d

 
 "Is this larger? Or this?"
 Atharvaveda 9.6.18

The  attained the peak of their popularity in the Brahmana period of late Vedic Sanskrit (roughly 8th century BC), with some 40 instances in the Shatapatha Brahmana alone.

Grammar

Literature

See also
Vedic Sanskrit grammar
Vedic metre
Vedic period
A Vedic Word Concordance
Avestan, a closely related sister language.

Notes

Glossary

Brahmic notes

References

Bibliography

External links

 Unicode signs for Vedic Sanskrit
index of Vedic texts (TITUS)
 Ancient Sanskrit Online by Karen Thomson and Jonathan Slocum, free online lessons at the Linguistics Research Center at the University of Texas at Austin
Introduction to Vedic chanting. Swami Tadatmananda (Arsha Bodha Center)
 glottothèque – Ancient Indo-European Grammar online, an online collection of introductory videos to Ancient Indo-European languages produced by the University of Göttingen

Phonology
 Vedic Accents
 Frederik Kortlandt "Accent and ablaut in the Vedic verbs"
 Melissa Frazier "Accent in Proto-Indo-European Athematic Nouns and Its Development in Vedic" (obsolete link) Internet Archive copy
 Arthur Anthony Macdonell "A Vedic Grammar for Students: Appendix II: Vedic Metre"

Other
  — Keyboard Software for typing in the International Alphabet for Sanskrit
  — sources results from Monier Williams etc.
  — dynamic online declension and conjugation tool

Vedic period
Sanskrit
Vyakarana
Indo-Aryan languages
Linguistic history of India
2nd-millennium BC establishments
Formal languages used for Indian scriptures
Indo-Iranian languages
Indo-European languages